"Out of Sight and on My Mind" is a song written by Bruce Burch and Rick Peoples, and recorded by American country music artist Billy Joe Royal.  It was released in March 1988 as the second single from the album The Royal Treatment.  The song reached number 10 on the Billboard Hot Country Singles & Tracks chart.

Charts

Weekly charts

Year-end charts

References

1988 singles
1987 songs
Billy Joe Royal songs
Atlantic Records singles
Songs written by Bruce Burch